Miss Scandinavia is a beauty pageant for Nordic females. The contest was merged with the Miss Baltic Sea pageant for the years 2007 and 2008 and after that the merged pageant was also discontinued.

It was sponsored by MTV3.

In 2021, the Miss Scandinavia pageant is back with new organizers under the Miss Scandinavia Organization.

Titleholders

Winners by countries and territories

Hosts

See also
 Miss Denmark, Miss Universe Denmark, Miss World Denmark
 Suomen Neito, Miss Finland
 Miss Iceland, Miss Universe Iceland
 Miss Norway
 Miss Sweden, Miss Universe Sweden, Miss World Sweden
 Miss Universe
 Miss World
 Miss International
 Miss Europe

External links
 Miss Scandinavia
 Miss Scandinavia at Pageantopolis
 Frøken Danmark
 Frøken Norge
 Fröken Sverige
 Suomen Neito
 Ungfrú Ísland

Scandinavia
Scandinavian culture
International beauty pageants
Continental beauty pageants